The Murrumbidgee River is a major river in New South Wales, Australia, with approximately ninety named tributaries in total; including 24 rivers, and numerous creeks and gullies.

The ordering of the basin, from source to mouth, is:

References